21st Century Film Corporation Inc. was a theatrical distribution company formed sometime in the 1970s as a production company and distributor. Menahem Golan served as CEO of the company from 1989 to the company's bankruptcy.

History
The company was formed by Tom Ward and Art Schweitzer around 1976 (though some sources claim it to be 1971) as a film production company and distributor. The company acquired most of the catalog of Dimension Pictures, after that company's bankruptcy in 1981. Along with theatrical distribution, 21st Century also released many films on home video, first via their short-lived label, Planet Video, from 1982 to 1983, and then through a more lucrative deal with Continental Video beginning in 1985.

In the late 1980s, while filing for bankruptcy, it was purchased by Giancarlo Parretti. Parretti had also recently purchased The Cannon Group, which was renamed Pathé Communications, and he eventually handed the newly rebranded 21st Century Film Corporation, along with the Spider-Man and Captain America film rights (held by Cannon), over to Israeli filmmaker Menahem Golan as part of Golan's severance package from Cannon. Golan's goal was to release high-quality motion pictures to the American and worldwide film audiences, but 21st Century only enjoyed small-scale success releasing low-budget films like Bullseye!, as well as remakes of The Phantom of the Opera and Night of the Living Dead.

In April 1989, Twenty-first Century Film and Pathé Communications ended their film production contract. As part of the termination, 21st Century Film received rights to two feature-length movies: the completed Mack the Knife, in production Phantom of the Opera plus other projects and scripts rights. With this Pathé would no longer have any financial obligations to 21st Century. Captain America was filmed and was given only a limited theatrical release worldwide. On May 17, 1989, 21st Century Film Corporation inked an agreement with Hoyts Corporation to serve a 20-film production and distribution agreement.

Looking for funding for the Spider-Man film was difficult; 21st Century sold the film's TV rights to Viacom, the home-video rights to Columbia and theatrical rights to Carolco. In 1993, Golan triggered a series of lawsuits for 21st Century over Spider-Man as he feared being pushed out. Bankruptcy followed within the year for the company. In 1995, the judge ruled that the Spider-Man film rights expired and reverted to Marvel. Meanwhile, all of 21st Century's film library and assets were acquired by Metro-Goldwyn-Mayer (which had merged with Pathé/Cannon earlier and was a theatrical distributor of Carolco's films at the time), mostly due to a quitclaim deed by Carolco.

In 1993, it released a few more movies including Deadly Heroes and most notably Death Wish V: The Face of Death, the last in the series and Charles Bronson's final theatrical film. Currently, the majority of 21st Century Film Corporation's film catalog is owned by MGM Studios, with the exception of Night of the Living Dead and The Forbidden Dance, both of which were distributed by Columbia Pictures.

Filmography

21st Century Distribution Corporation

21st Century Film Corporation

References

Film production companies of the United States
Entertainment companies based in California

Companies based in Los Angeles
American companies established in 1971
Entertainment companies established in 1971
American companies disestablished in 1996
1971 establishments in California
1996 disestablishments in California
Companies that filed for Chapter 11 bankruptcy in 1996
Defunct companies based in Greater Los Angeles
1996 mergers and acquisitions